Betula nana, the dwarf birch, is a species of birch in the family Betulaceae, found mainly in the tundra of the Arctic region.

Description
The bark is non-peeling and shiny red-copper colored. The leaves are rounded,  diameter, with a bluntly toothed margin. The leaves are a darker green on their upper surface. Leaf growth occurs after snow melt and become red in autumn.

Distribution
Betula nana is native to arctic and cool temperate regions of Greenland, Iceland, northern Europe, northern Asia and northern North America and it will grow in a variety of conditions. Its northern range limit is on Svalbard, where it is confined to favourable sites. In the UK Betula nana is at its southern range limit, with many populations having declined significantly in recent decades. In southern Sweden the occurrence of Betula nana in Sund, Ydre is deemed a glacial relict.

In general, it favours wet but well-drained sites with a nutrient-poor, acidic soil which can be xeric and rocky. B. nana has a low tolerance for shade.

Ecology
There are two subspecies:
Betula nana subsp. nana. Canada (Baffin Island), Greenland, northern Europe (south to the Alps at high altitudes), northwestern Asia. Young twigs hairy, but without resin; leaves longer (to 20 mm), usually as long as broad.
Betula nana subsp. exilis. Northeastern Asia, northern North America (Alaska, Canada east to Nunavut). Young twigs hairless or with only scattered hairs, but coated in resin; leaves shorter (not over 12 mm long), often broader than long.

Genome
The genome of B. nana  has been sequenced.

References

External links
Trees for Life: Species profile and Reference list
Flora of North America: Betula nana
Betula nana Distribution map
Conservation Genetics and Population History of Betula nana etc., in Svalbard
Dwarf birch genome website
Literature arising from the Expedition » Betula nana

nana
Alpine flora
Flora of Europe
Flora of Siberia
Flora of Subarctic America
Flora of the Russian Far East
Flora of Western Canada
Plants described in 1753
Taxa named by Carl Linnaeus